Simplemente Amigos (Just Friends) is Myriam's fifth studio album, released in 2007. In this album Myriam pays tribute to one of Mexico's most famous female singers, Ana Gabriel, by singing 12 of her biggest hits. The first single from the album is "Simplemente Amigos". The album was certificated as gold status by selling more than 50,000 copies but according to a report from EMI Televisa Music the album sold 300,000 copies in 5 hours of being launched, which would be triple platinum.

Album information
Myriam traveled to Madrid, Spain in order to record Simplemente Amigos. Mariano Perez who worked with her the last album was also the producer of this album. The album was very well received, reaching number 8 in the Mexican charts midweek after launch and reaching the top at the end of the week. EMI music give Myriam two gold awards for the high sales of the album.

Track listing

Acoustic version (bonus)

 Simplemente Amigos [acoustic version]
 Mar y Arena [acoustic version]
 Pecado Original [acoustic version]
 Evidencias [acoustic version]
 Interview with prodigy & MSN

External links
The Official Website of Myriam Montemayor Cruz

2007 albums
Myriam Montemayor Cruz albums
Tribute albums